Monir Benmoussa (born 19 July 1994) is a Norwegian football striker who plays for Holmlia SK.

He started his youth career in Holmlia SK. He made his Norwegian Premier League debut for Vålerenga Fotball in September 2013 against Molde, but only played that sole game.

Ahead of the 2014 season he joined Bærum SK. Ahead of the 2016 season he joined Fredrikstad. After one season where he only featured in four games, he moved on to Florø SK. He was injured and on free transfer for the first half of 2018, then signed for Lysekloster. In 2019 he returned to his childhood club of Holmlia.

References

External links
Monir Benmoussa at NFF

1994 births
Living people
Footballers from Oslo
Norwegian footballers
Vålerenga Fotball players
Bærum SK players
Fredrikstad FK players
Eliteserien players
Norwegian First Division players

Association football forwards
Holmlia SK players